Finland competed at the 2019 World Championships in Athletics in Doha, Qatar, from 27 September to 6 October 2019.

Athlete selections 

The Finnish Amateur Athletic Association named the first 4 athletes of the team on 25 March 2019. The list was extended with 7 further athletes on 1 July 2019. Taika Koilahti and Wilma Murto were added to the team based on their ranking on 10 September 2019 bringing the total number of athletes to 19.

Results

Men
Track and road events

Field events

Women
Track and road events

Field events

Combined events – Heptathlon

External links 
  Finland — IAAF World Athletics Championships, Doha 2019

References

Nations at the 2019 World Athletics Championships
World Championships in Athletics
2019